Lakeside High School is a public high school located in Lake Elsinore, California and is part of the Lake Elsinore Unified School District. Lakeside High School has been rated as one of the top 10 most beautiful high school campuses in California.

Sports
In 2012, the Lakeside Lancers Boys' Varsity Soccer Team beat Cajon High School with a 3–1 score to win the CIF Championship.

In 2021, the Boys' Swimming team won league championship at Polytechnic High, Riverside.

References

External links
 Official Website

High schools in Riverside County, California
Public high schools in California
2005 establishments in California